The following is a table of many of the most fundamental Proto-Indo-European language (PIE) words and roots, with their cognates in all of the major families of descendants.

Notes
The following conventions are used:
 Cognates are in general given in the oldest well-documented language of each family, although forms in modern languages are given for families in which the older stages of the languages are poorly documented or do not differ significantly from the modern languages. In addition, modern English forms are given for comparison purposes.
 Nouns are given in their nominative case, with the genitive case supplied in parentheses when its stem differs from that of the nominative. (For some languages, especially Sanskrit, the basic stem is given in place of the nominative.)
 Verbs are given in their "dictionary form".  The exact form given depends on the specific language:
 For the Germanic languages and for Welsh, the infinitive is given.
 For Latin, the Baltic languages, and the Slavic languages, the first-person singular present indicative is given, with the infinitive supplied in parentheses.
 For Greek, Old Irish, Armenian and Albanian (modern), only the first-person singular present indicative is given.
 For Sanskrit, Avestan, Old Persian, Parthian, the third-person singular present indicative is given. Where useful Sanskrit root forms are provided using the symbol √.
 For Tocharian, the stem is given.
 For Hittite, either the third-person singular present indicative or the stem is given.
 In place of Latin, an Oscan or Umbrian cognate is occasionally given when no corresponding Latin cognate exists. Similarly, a cognate from another Anatolian language (e.g. Luvian, Lycian) may occasionally be given in place of or in addition to Hittite.
 For Tocharian, both the Tocharian A and Tocharian B cognates are given whenever possible.
 For the Celtic languages, both Old Irish and Welsh cognates are given when possible. For Welsh, normally the modern form is given, but occasionally the form from Old Welsh is supplied when it is known and displays important features lost in the modern form. A Middle Irish cognate is given when the Old Irish form is unknown, and Gaulish, Cornish and/or Breton (modern) cognates may occasionally be given in place of or in addition to Welsh.
 For the Baltic languages, Lithuanian (modern) and Old Prussian cognates are given when possible. (Both Lithuanian and Old Prussian are included because Lithuanian often includes information missing in Old Prussian, e.g. due to lack of written accent marks in the latter.) Similarly to the Celtic situation, Old Lithuanian forms may occasionally be given in place of modern Lithuanian; Latvian (modern) may occasionally be given in place of or in addition to Lithuanian.
 For the Slavic languages, Old Church Slavonic cognates are given when possible.  Forms from modern Slavic languages or other Church Slavic dialects may occasionally be given in place of Old Church Slavonic.
 For English, a modern English cognate is given when it exists, along with the corresponding Old English form; otherwise, only an Old English form is given.
 For Gothic, a form in another Germanic language (Old Norse; Old High German; or Middle High German) is sometimes given in its place or in addition, when it reveals important features.

Kinship

{| class="wikitable" style="font-size:95%;"
! width="10%"| PIE
! width="8%"| English
! width="8%"| Gothic
! width="8%"| Latin
! width="8%"| Ancient Greek
! width="8%"| Sanskrit
! width="7%"| Iranian
! width="8%"| Slavic
! width="8%"| Baltic
! width="7%"| Celtic
! width="7%"| Armenian
! width="7%"| Albanian
! width="7%"| Tocharian
! width="7%"| Hittite
|-
! style="font-weight:normal;" |  "mother"
| mother (< OE mōdor)
| mōdar "mother"
| māter "mother" ⇒ 
| mḗtēr "mother" ⇒ 
| mā́tṛ, mātṛ́ "mother"
| Av mātar- "mother"; NPers mādar "mother"; Kurdish mak "mother"
| OCS mati, mater- "mother"
| Lith móteris "woman", motina; OPrus muti "mother"
| Gaul. mātīr "mother", 
OIr māthir "mother"; W modryb "auntie"
| mayr "mother"
| motër "sister"
| A mācar, B mācer "mother"
|
|-
! style="font-weight:normal;" |  "father" 
| father (< OE fæder)
| fadar "father"
| pater "father" ⇒ 
| patḗr "father" (> patriarch)
| pitṛ́ "father"; Pitrs "spirits of the ancestors" (litt. "the fathers")
| Av pitar- (nom. also pta, ta), OPers pita "father", NPers pedar 
| otets "father" Russian
|
| OIr athir "father"; Welsh edrydd "paternal domain"
| hayr "father"
| atë "father" 
| A pācar, B pācer "father"
|
|-
!  "brother"
| brother (< OE brōþor)
| brōþar "brother"
| frāter "brother" ⇒ 
| pʰrā́tēr "member of a phratry (brotherhood)" (> phratry)
| bʰrā́tṛ  "brother"; Rom phral "brother" (> pal)
| Av brātar-, OPers brātar-, NPers brādar-, Ossetian ärvád "brother, relative", NPers barādar, Kurdish bira
| OCS bratrŭ "brother"
| Lith brõlis, OPrus brati "brother"
| Gaul Bratronos (pers. name); OIr brāth(a)ir, W brawd (pl. brodyr)  "brother"
| ełbayr (gen. ełbawr) "brother"
|
| A pracar, B procer "brother"
|Lyd brafr(-sis) "brother"
|-
!  "sister"
| sister (< OE sweostor, influenced by ON systir)
| swistar "sister"
| soror "sister" ⇒ 
| éor "cousin's daughter"
| svásṛ "sister"
| Av x̌vaŋhar- "sister"; NPers ḫwāhar "sister"; 
Kurdish xwişk "sister" sw- > xw-
| OCS sestra "sister"
| Lith sesuo, seser-, OPrus sestra "sister"
| Gaul suiorebe "with two sisters" (dual)
OIr siur, W chwaer "sister"
| kʿoyr (kʿeṙ), nom.pl kʿor-kʿ "sister"
| vashë, vajzë "girl" (< *varjë < *vëharë < PAlb *swesarā)
| A ṣar, B ṣer "sister"
|
|-
!  "sibling, lit. same-father(ed)" 
|
|ON samfeðra|
|homopátōr|
|OP hamapitar-|
|
|
|
|
|A ṣomapacar|
|-
!  "daughter"Dnghu, pp. 757-758.Mallory & Adams (2006), p. 213.
| daughter (< OE dohtor)
| daúhtar "daughter"
| Oscan futír "daughter"
| θugátēr "daughter"; Myc tu-ka-te "daughter"
| dúhitṛ  "daughter"
| Av dugədar-, duɣδar-, NPers doḫtar "daughter" Kurdish dot "daughter"
| OCS dŭšti, dŭšter- "daughter"
| Lith duktė, dukter-, OPrus dukti "daughter"
| Gaulish duxtir "daughter"; Celtib TuaTer (duater) "daughter"
| dustr "daughter"
|
| A ckācar, B tkācer "daughter"
| HLuw túwatara "daughter";
?Lyd datro "daughter"; CLuw/Hitt duttarii̯ata-;
Lyc kbatra "daughter"
|-
!   "son" (See also *sewh₁-)
| son (< OE sunu)
| sunus "son"
|
| huiós "son"
| sūnú- "son"
| Av hunuš "son"
| OCS synŭ "son"
| Lith  sūnùs, OPrus suns "son"
|? Celtib EBURSUNOS "son of Eburos (?)"
? Celt/Lus EQUEUNUBO (< *ekwei-sūnu-bʰos) "to the sons on the horse"
| ustr "son"
| çun "boy/son"
| A se, B soyä "son"
|
|-
!  "son" Monier Williams, p. 632.
|
|
|Osc puklo- "son"
|paîs "son"
|putrá- "son"
|Av puθra "son"
Kurdish pis , put|
|
|
| 
|
|
|
|-
!  "nephew, grandson" Pokorny, p. 764.
| nephew; obsolete neve "nephew, male cousin, grandson" (< OE nefa)
| OHG nevo "nephew"
| nepōs (nepōtis) "grandson, nephew" ⇒ 
| népodes "descendants"
| nápāt- "grandson, descendant"
| Av napāt-, naptar-, OPers napāt-, NPers naveh-, "grandson, descendant"; Kurdish nevî "grandchild"
| OCS netii "nephew"
| OLith nepotis, OPrus neputs "grandson"
| OIr nïæ "sister's son", W nai "nephew"
|
| nip "grandson, nephew"
|
|
|-
!  "granddaughter, niece"
| niece; obsolete nift "niece" (< OE nift)
| OHG nift "niece"
| neptis "granddaughter"
|
| naptī́ "granddaughter"
|
|
|
| OIr necht "niece"
|
|
|
|
|-
!  "husband's brother, brother-in-law"
| OE tācor "husband's brother"
| OHG zeihhor "husband's brother"
| levir "husband's brother"
| dāēr "husband's brother"
| devṛ́, devará "husband's brother"
| Past lewar  "brother-in-law"
| OCS děverĭ "brother-in-law"
| Lith dieveris "husband's brother"
| W daw(f) "brother-in-law"
| taygr "husband's brother"
| dhëndër, dhëndër "son-in-law" from PAlb *ĝāmtḗr- or *dzanra or *jantura-.All ultimately from Proto-Indo-European *ǵem- (“to marry”).
|
| 
|-
!  "daughter-in-law"
| OE snoru "daughter-in-law"
| OHG snur "daughter-in-law"
| nurus "daughter-in-law"
| nuós "daughter-in-law"
| snuṣā- "daughter-in-law"
| Old Ir. *(s)nušáh Bactrian ασνωυο (asnōuo) NPers. sunoh / sunhār "daughter-in-law"
| OCS snŭxa "daughter-in-law"
| 
| W gwaudd "daughter-in-law"
| nu "daughter-in-law"
| nuse "bride" 
| B santse "daughter-in-law"
|
|-
!*wedʰ- "pledge, bind, secure, lead"
|wed (< OE weddian "to pledge, wed")
|
|
|
|vadhū́ "bride"
|
|OCS voditi "to lead"
|
|
|
|
|
|
|-
!  "father-in-law"
| OE swēor "father-in-law"
| swaihra "father-in-law"
| socer "father-in-law"
| hekurós "father-in-law"
| śváśura "father-in-law"
| Av xᵛasura "father-in-law"
| OCS svekrŭ "father-in-law"
| Lith šešuras "father-in-law" 
|
|
| vjehërr "father-in-law"
|
|
|-
!  "mother-in-law"
| OE sweger "mother-in-law"
| swaihro  "mother-in-law"
| socrus "mother-in-law"
| hekurá "mother-in-law"
| śvaśrū́- "mother-in-law"
| Past xwāše "mother-in-law"
| OCS svekry "mother-in-law"
| Lith šešuras "father-in-law", OPrus swasri "mother-in-law"
| W chwegr "mother-in-law"
| skesur "mother-in-law"
| vjehrrë "mother-in-law"
| 
|
|-
!  "maternal grandfather, maternal uncle"
| 
| awō "grandmother"
| avus "grandfather"; avunculus "maternal uncle" ⇒ 
| 
| 
| 
| Rus uj, vuj "uncle" (obsolete); Ukr vuyko "maternal uncle"
| Lith avynas "maternal uncle", OPrus awis "uncle"
| MW ewythr, MBre eontr, MCo eviter "maternal uncle" (< PCelt awon-tīr "uncle"); OIr aue "descendant, grandchild"
| OArm haw "grandfather"
| 
| B āwe "grandfather"
| ḫuḫḫa-, Lyc χuga- "grandfather";
CLuw ḫu-u-ḫa-ti "grandfather" (abl.-ins.)
|-
! "twin; to hold"Pokorny, p. 505
|
|ON Ymir|geminus "twin";Remus "twin, Remus"
|
|yáma- "twin; first man to die"
|Av Yema|
|
|OIr emon, Gaul Iemurioi "twin?"
|
|
|
|
|-
!*h₁widʰéwh₂ "widow" < *h₁weydʰh₁- "to separate"
|widow (< OE widwe)
|widuwō "widow"
|vidua "widow"
|ēḯtheos "widow"
|vidhávā "widow"
|viδauua "widow"
| OCS vŭdova "widow"
| OP widdewū "widow"
| OI fedb "widow"; MW gweddw "widow, widower"
|
|vejë "widow"
|
|
|}

People

Pronouns and particles

Numbers

Body

Animals

Food and farming

Bodily functions and states

Mental functions and states

General conditions and states

Natural features

Directions

Basic adjectives

Light and color

Positive qualities

Construction, fabrication

Self-motion, rest

Object motion

Time

Ideas and rituals

Unclassified

 Derivatives 

 Footnotes 

 Tabular notes 

 References 

 Bibliography 
 
 Dnghu. Proto-Indo-European Etymological Dictionary. (A revised edition of Julius Pokorny's Indogermanisches Etymologisches Wörterbuch, CCA-GNU)
 
 
 
 Delamarre, Xavier. Le Vocabulaire Indo-Européen. Paris: Librairie d'Amérique et d'Orient. 1984. 
 Delamarre, Xavier (2003). Dictionnaire de la langue gauloise: Une approche linguistique du vieux-celtique continental. Errance. .
 Kloekhorst, Alwin. Etymological Dictionary of the Hittite Inherited Lexicon. Leiden Indo-European Etymological Dictionary Series 5. Leiden, The Netherlands; Boston, 2008. https://hdl.handle.net/1887/11996
 Matasovic, Ranko. Etymological Dictionary Of Proto Celtic. Leiden, The Netherlands: Brill. 2009. 
 

 Further reading On numerals:
 
 
  
 On nature and the passage of time:
 Blažek, Václav. "Astronomická terminologie v indoevropských jazycích" [Astronomic terminology in Indo-European languages]. In: Sborník prací Filozofické fakulty brněnské univerzity. A, Řada jazykovědná = Linguistica Brunensia. 2005, vol. 54, iss. A53, pp. [31]-49. .
 
 On animals:
 
 
 
 Huard, Athanaric. "On Tocharian B kents* and PIE *g̑hans- ‘goose’". In: wékwos: Revue d'études indo-européennes. Volume 5. Les Cent Chemins. 2019. .
 
 On kinship and family:
 Blažek, Václav. "Indo-European *suHnu- 'son' and his relatives". In: Indogermanistik und Linguistik im Dialog. Akten der XIII. Fachtagung der Indogermanischen Gesellschaft von 21. bis 27. September 2008 in Salzburg, hrg. Thomas Krisch & Thomas Lindner. Wiesbaden: Reichert, 2011. pp. 79–89. 
 Cooper, Brian. "The Lexicology and Etymology of Russian Family Relationships". In: Studia Etymologica Cracoviensia Vol. 14. Issue 1. Kraków: 2009. pp. 153–176. 
 
 
 
 
 
 
 
 
 
 
 On agriculture and produce:
 Blažek, Václav. "On Indo-European ‘barley’". In: Simmelkjaer Sandgaard Hansen, Bjarne; Nielsen Whitehead, Benedicte; Olander, Thomas; Olsen, Birgit Anette. Etymology and the European Lexicon. Proceedings of the 14th Fachtagung der Indogermanischen Gesellschaft (17-22 September 2012, Copenhagen). Wiesbaden: Reichert Verlag, 2016. pp. 53–68. 
 
 
 
 
 On colors:
 On verbs related to action and motion:
 On bodily functions''':
   [on PIE roots for sleep and dream'']

External links 

 Query Julius Pokorny's landmark Indogermanisches Etymologisches Wörterbuch , the standard reference for Indo-European vocabulary. Complete coverage of cognates of each root (although Hittite and Tocharian coverage is spotty), highly accurate forms.  Beware, roots are given in pre-laryngeal form and glosses are in German.
 American Heritage Indo-European Roots Index
 Database query to the online version of Pokorny's PIE dictionary
 Index to the online version of Pokorny's PIE dictionary
 Jonathan Slocum, Indo-European Lexicon from the University of Texas Linguistic Research Center
 Dougas Harper's Etymonline

Vocabulary
Indo-European linguistics
 
Lexis (linguistics)
Vocabulary